The 2019 Copa del Rey de Hockey Hierba is the 102nd edition of the Copa del Rey de Hockey Hierba, Spain's annual field hockey cup competition. It was held from 22 to 24 March at Club de Campo in Madrid.

The eight best teams from the first half of the 2018–19 División de Honor will participate in the tournament. The participating teams are Real Club de Polo, Atlètic Terrassa, Club Egara, the hosts Club de Campo, Junior, CD Terrassa, Tenis and Jolaseta. Club Egara are the defending champions, having won the 2017–18 edition. However they were beaten in the semi-finals by the eventual champions Real Club de Polo 5–4 after a shoot-out.

Real Club de Polo won a record-extending 30th title by defeating Atlètic Terrassa 3–1 in the final.

Results
The draw took place on 29 January 2019.

Bracket

Quarter-finals

Semi-finals

Third and fourth place

Final

References

External links
Official competition page

Copa del Rey de Hockey Hierba
field hockey
field hockey
Spain